The Story of the Prophet Iddo (also called the Midrash of the Prophet Iddo and Visions of Iddo the Seer) is a lost work mentioned in the Bible, attributed to the biblical prophet Iddo who lived at the time of King Rehoboam.

Biblical references 
The book is described at 2 Chronicles 9:29, relating to the acts of Solomon:

It is also described in 2 Chronicles 12:15, relating to acts of Rehoboam:

The book is also described at 2 Chronicles 13:22, relating to relating to acts of Abijah:

Nehemiah 12:16 and Zech 1:1 tell us that Zechariah the Prophet was a son of Iddo.  And Zechariah returned to the land from Captivity.

References 

Lost Jewish texts
Books of Chronicles